Meridarchis excisa is a moth in the Carposinidae family. It was described by Walsingham in 1900. It is found in Russia (Primorskii krai) and Japan.

References

Natural History Museum Lepidoptera generic names catalog

Carposinidae
Moths described in 1900